Wellbeing was a British well-being and lifestyle channel broadcast under the joint venture of Granada TV and the Boots Pharmacy chain. The channel was launched on 14 March 2001 and closed on 31 December 2001 after nine months of run time. It was replaced by ITV Select, on ITV Digital, on 26 January 2002.

References

External links
Wellbeing Official Site (Archive)

Television channels and stations established in 2001
Television channels and stations disestablished in 2001